The Château de Pregny, sometimes referred to as the Rothschild Castle, is a castle in the municipality of Pregny-Chambésy of the Canton of Geneva in Switzerland.  It is a Swiss heritage site of national significance.

History
The chateau was built in 1858 by the Swiss banker, Adolphe Carl de Rothschild, who died childless in 1900. He bequeathed to a cousin, Maurice de Rothschild of the Rothschild banking family of France, who in turn left it to his son, Edmond Adolphe de Rothschild. The property remains in the family and as at 2013 is the principal residence of Edmond's widow, Nadine.

See also
 List of castles in Switzerland

References

Castles in the canton of Geneva
Cultural property of national significance in the canton of Geneva
Rothschild family residences